An arsenal ship is a concept for a floating missile platform intended to have as many as five hundred vertical launch bays for mid-sized missiles, most likely cruise missiles. In current U.S. naval thinking, such a ship would initially be controlled remotely by an Aegis Cruiser, although plans include control by AWACS aircraft such as the E-2 Hawkeye and E-3 Sentry.

History
Proposed by the U.S. Navy in 1996, the arsenal ship had funding problems, with the United States Congress cancelling some funding, and the Defense Advanced Research Projects Agency (DARPA) providing some funding to individual contractors for prototypes. Some concept artwork of the Arsenal Ship was produced, with some images bearing the number "72", possibly hinting at an intent to classify the arsenal ships as a battleship, since the last battleship ordered (but never built) was USS Louisiana (BB-71).

The arsenal ship would have a small crew and as many as 500 vertical launch tubes for missiles to provide ship-to-shore bombardment for invading troops. The Navy calculated a $450 million price for the arsenal ship, but Congress scrapped funding for the project in 1998.

The U.S. Navy has since modified the four oldest  Trident submarines to SSGN configuration, allowing them to carry up to 154 Tomahawk cruise missiles using vertical launching systems installed in the tubes which previously held strategic ballistic missiles, creating a vessel roughly equivalent to the arsenal ship concept.

In 2013, Huntington Ingalls Industries revived the idea when it proposed a Flight II version of the LPD-17 hull with a variant carrying up to 288 VLS cells for the ballistic missile defense and precision strike missions.

China has conducted studies and tested models of partially and completely submersible arsenal ship concepts. South Korea is also planning to deploy three arsenal ships by the late 2020s.

See also
 
 Strike cruiser

References

General references

 Holzer, Robert. "Commanders May Share Arsenal Ship Assets." Defense News, (17–23 June 1996)" 10.
 Holzer, Robert with Pat Cooper. "Warships May Use Leaner Crews: Report Recommends Additional Firepower for U.S. Navy Vessels." Defense News, (29 January – 4 February 1996): 4.
 Holzer, Robert. "U.S. Navy Eyes Options as Arsenal Ship Takes Shape." Defense News, (5–11 February 1996): 20.
 Holzer, Robert. "U.S. Navy's New Arsenal Ship Takes shape." Defense News, (8–14 April 1996): 4.
 Lok, Joris Janssen. "Arsenal Ship Will Pilot Future USN Combatants." Janes Defense Weekly, 17 April 1996: 3.
 Metcalf, Joseph III. "Revolutions at Sea." U.S. Naval Institute Proceedings, 114, no. 1019 (January 1988): 34–39.
 Pickell, Greg. "Arsenal Ship fails to Hit the Mark," Defense News, (16 October 1995 – 22 October 1995): 55.
 Scott, Richard, ed. "Arsenal Ship Programme Launched." Jane's Navy International, 101, no. 7 (1 September 1996): 5.
 Smith, Edward A. "Naval Firepower for the 21st Century." The Washington Post, 27 July 1996.
 Stearman, William L. "The Navy Proposes Arsenal Ship." The Retired Officer Magazine, 102, no. 11 (November 1996): 39.
 Stearman, William L. "A Misguided Missile Ship: Old Battleships Would Do a Better Job Than a Pricey New Boat," The Washington Post, (7 July 1996): C03.
 Stearman, William L. "The American Scud." Navy News & Undersea Technology, 12, no. 41 (23 October 1995).
 Truver, Scott C. "Floating Arsenal to be 21st Century Battleship." International Defense Review, 29, no. 7 (1 July 1996): 44.
 U.S. Department of Defense. Arsenal Ship...21st Century Battleship. Brief prepared by OPNAV (N86). Washington, D.C.: 23 May 1996.
 U.S. Department of Defense. Arsenal Ship Program. Joint memorandum signed by Larry Lynn, John W. Douglass and J.M. Boorda. Washington, D.C.: 18 March 1996.
 U.S. Department of Defense. Promulgation of The Arsenal Ship Concept of Operations. Memorandum for Distribution by Daniel J. Murphy. Washington, D.C.: 11 April 1996.
 U.S. Department of Defense. The Arsenal Ship. Brief prepared by OPNAV (N86). Washington, D.C.: 29 August 1996.

External links
 FAS page on Arsenal Ships
 Dawn H. Driesbach's paper on arsenal ships
 TRAMCO Striker page
 Arsenal ship – GlobalSecurity.org

Abandoned military projects of the United States
Ship types
Proposed ships of the United States Navy